Brennan Cole Poole (born April 11, 1991) is an American professional stock car racing driver, engineer, consultant, driver coach, spotter, and crew chief. He competes full-time in the  NASCAR Xfinity Series, driving the No. 6 Chevrolet Camaro for JD Motorsports and part-time in the NASCAR Craftsman Truck Series, driving the No. 46 Toyota Tundra for G2G Racing. He has raced in each of NASCAR's top three divisions as well as the ARCA Menards Series where he has multiple wins.

Racing career

Early career

UMP Modifieds

Poole drove Dirt Modifieds in the UMP ranks from 2007 to 2008 for his family's team at their hometrack of Houston Raceway Park, he scored 7 wins in 2008 and the Texas World Dirt Championship.

UARA-Stars Late Models
In 2011, Poole scored four UARA-Stars wins at Hickory, Kingsport, Rockingham, and Lonesome Pine. He clinched the championship at Rockingham after locking the championship up a week before at Concord.

ARCA Racing Series

2011
Poole made his debut in the ARCA Racing Series at Salem Speedway in 2011, driving the No. 55 Chevrolet for Venturini Motorsports, in which Poole would lead 31 laps and win in his debut. Poole ran three more races that year in Venturini's 25 car, scoring a pole and a top five finish at Pocono Raceway.

2012

Poole ran the full 2012 schedule for Venturini in the 25 car, earning 15 top tens, three poles, and back-to-back wins at Elko Speedway and Pocono Raceway while going on to finish 3rd in points.

2013
Poole ran part-time schedules over the next two years for Venturini. At the Illinois State Fairgrounds Racetrack, Poole crossed the finish line in third but was awarded the win after it was determined that the two drivers who finished ahead of him, Kelly Kovski and A. J. Fike, jumped the final restart.

2014
In 2014, Poole returned at Pocono Raceway in which he led 31 of 50 laps. He returned again for the next six races as a substitute for John Wes Townley; Poole scored four top fives and a victory at Kentucky Speedway in his final ARCA start in the No. 15. Poole was later penalized 25 driver points after his Kentucky car was found to be in violation of the minimum roof height rule.

2015
Poole signed a contract with Team BCR Racing to run 10 races in the 2015 season to drive the No. 45 Ford Fusion for the team, replacing Grant Enfinger but would withdraw from the season opener at Daytona and never make a start after that.

2018
Poole returned to Venturini as a relief driver at Pocono Raceway in 2018, relieving Natalie Decker, who was recovering from surgery. He nearly won the race which would’ve made Decker the first female winner in ARCA Racing Series history as she started the race but he ultimately struggled to gain his speed back after a late race caution as he was passing Harrison Burton for the lead.

Other ventures in ARCA
During his ARCA career, Poole worked several odd jobs within auto racing between starts, including serving as a consultant, spotter, driver coach, and working in shop for Venturini Motorsports. He also served as a cameraman for Dartfish racing analysis videos.

Xfinity Series

2015
In 2015, Poole was signed to drive in the Xfinity Series for HScott Motorsports with Chip Ganassi, with the operation being run out of Ganassi's NASCAR shop. Poole shared the No. 42 ride with Ganassi Sprint Cup Series driver Kyle Larson and Justin Marks. In between starts he also traveled to Sprint Cup races as an observer with Ganassi's other Cup driver, Jamie McMurray. On May 17, Poole was parked by NASCAR during the race at Iowa Speedway after intentionally turning J. J. Yeley into the outside wall in response to Yeley turning Poole into the wall earlier. In total he scored two top tens and ten top-fifteen finishes during the season.

2016

For 2016, Poole moved into a new No. 48 car for Ganassi full-time with sponsorship from DC Solar for the full season. At Talladega, Poole finished third after crossing the finish line first after a last-lap caution. NASCAR reviewed the finish and later awarded Elliott Sadler the win by virtue of being in first when the caution flag was displayed. Poole finished eighth in points, scoring 17 top tens and four top fives.

2017

He returned to CGR's No. 48 for 2017. He won his first career series pole at Daytona International Speedway in July. Poole advanced to the Round of 8 in the Xfinity Series playoffs, but fell out of the elimination race early after contact with Caesar Bacarella. Poole finished sixth at Homestead, finishing sixth in points.

On June 18, 2018, it was announced that Poole would sue Chip Ganassi Racing, and agency Spire Sports + Entertainment for breach of contract, alleging that CGR and Spire conspired to take away DC Solar's sponsorship from Poole and move it to the No. 42 CGR Cup Series team and that Spire's involvement representing both driver and team constituted a conflict of interest. Ganassi and Spire both released statements through attorneys denying the claims, with CGR's statement saying the sponsorship of Poole ended "because he never won a race despite the advantages of the best equipment in the garage." Poole, CGR, and Spire would later settle their dispute out-of-court at the end of 2018 following DC Solar's FBI raid, although terms were not released.

2018

Poole tested for GMS Racing at Charlotte Motor Speedway in May of 2018 and was expected to run all the races that the suspended Spencer Gallagher would miss however he would ultimately not make a single start for the team.

2022
After 5 seasons of not competing in the series he would return to run the entire West Coast Swing in the No. 47 Chevrolet Camaro for Mike Harmon Racing. Poole attempted his first race with MHR in the Production Alliance Group 300at Auto Club, but Poole missed the field. He would successfully make the field the following week at Las Vegas. However only three laps into the event, the engine gave out, leaving him 37th.  Poole would then fail to qualify for the next three races, before finally making the field once again at Richmond Raceway, however rear gear issues knocked Poole out of the event after 112 laps. He would then qualify for the second time in a row at Martinsville, but couldn’t even turn a lap thanks to the clutch failing on him. He would only make four more races with the team until moving to Jimmy Means Racing for Bristol, but failed to qualify.

Poole would then sign a three race deal with JD Motorsports in the No. 6 Chevrolet at Texas, Homestead and Phoenix. He would finish 31st in his first start with the team at Texas due to a multiple car pileup midway through the race. At Homestead, he would finish 14th, his best finish since 2017 at the same track. At Phoenix, he would sport the Out of the Groove Camaro, which featured host Eric Estepp's face on the hood. Estepp would later publish a race vlog on his channel about the whole opportunity.

2023

On December 12, 2022 it was announced Poole would run full-time for JD Motorsports in the No. 6, his first full-time stint in NASCAR since 2020 and his first in the NASCAR Xfinity Series since 2017. On February 9, 2023 Macc Door Systems announced they would sponsor Poole in 6 races starting at the season opener at Daytona and also both races at Las Vegas, Talladega, Nashville, and Bristol.

He would start the season off by finishing 33rd with a DNF at Daytona after running top 15 much of the night. At Las Vegas he would do much of the same and finish 25th, this time finishing the race.

Craftsman Truck Series

2015
In 2015, Poole made his Truck Series debut at Las Vegas Motor Speedway, driving the No. 21 Chevrolet for GMS Racing, where he qualified 15th and finished 11th.

2018
On October 31, 2018, it was announced Poole would return to the series for a one-off race with NextGen Motorsports in the No. 35 Toyota Tundra. His fifteenth-place finish was encumbered due to the team violating rule 20.3.4 in the NASCAR rule book.

On November 2, 2018, Poole announced he would return with NextGen Motorsports in the No. 35 at Homestead-Miami Speedway for the Truck Series season finale. He finished  19th after dealing with a stuck accelerator during the race.

2019
On January 28, 2019, Poole announced a full-time schedule with On Point Motorsports for the 2019 NASCAR Gander Outdoors Truck Series, driving the No. 30. Poole finished in the top ten for the first time after avoiding late attrition at Texas Motor Speedway early in the season. The team later scaled back its effort due to sponsorship concerns. Utilizing a chassis from 2007 and dealing with a broken sway bar during the race, Poole finished second at Charlotte in May. On July 11 at Kentucky Speedway, the lapped truck of Poole made contact with Ben Rhodes, who was running second. Both drivers acquired enough damage to make additional pit stops. After the race, Rhodes charged Poole, irate that a slower truck cost Rhodes a shot at a NASCAR playoffs berth, which would have come with a win.

2020

Although he moved to the Cup Series for the 2020 season, Poole continued racing in the Truck Series with On Point Motorsports on a part-time basis beginning at Daytona. He ran the first 11 races of the season, recording a best finish of 12th in both Kansas Speedway doubleheader races in July.

Scott Lagasse Jr. and Danny Bohn took over the No. 30 after the Michigan International Speedway race in August as Poole had run out of eligible Truck races as a full-time Cup driver.

2021
In June 2021, Poole made his return to NASCAR and On Point Motorsports for the Truck race at Texas Motor Speedway.

2022
On February 28, 2022, it was announced Poole would drive part-time in the No. 46 for G2G Racing starting at Las Vegas however, would be replaced by Matt Jaskol, G2G Racing's full-time driver after Poole qualified in on speed and Jaskol failed to do so. He would drive G2G's No. 47 at Atlanta. He returned to the team at Darlington.

NASCAR Cup Series

2020
On December 11, 2019, Poole announced he would race full-time for Premium Motorsports in the No. 15 in the NASCAR Cup Series for 2020.

On February 3, 2020, Poole announced at the NASCAR Hall Of Fame that Spartan Mosquito Eradicators as a primary sponsor through their Spartan GO! line of products and R.E.D. would join him as an associate sponsor both for 17 races starting at the Daytona 500 which would also include the Bluegreen Vacations Duel and NASCAR All-Star Race.

In September, Poole was replaced by J. J. Yeley in the No. 15 for the Bass Pro Shops NRA Night Race due to sponsorship reasons,  though he remained with the team. At the time, Poole was 32nd in points.

In the 2020 YellaWood 500 at Talladega Superspeedway on October 4, Poole earned his career best Cup Series finish. He crossed the line in 11th, but finished 9th due to penalties issued against Matt DiBenedetto and Chris Buescher.

Other racing

Asphalt Modifieds
In July 2019 Poole made his Asphalt Modified debut at Bowman Gray Stadium for Truck Series team On Point Motorsports in their No. 30 entry finishing 24th after having plug wire issues early on in the race.

Late Model Stocks
On September 27, 2019, Poole made his first appearance in a Late Model Stock for the first time since his UARA-Stars championship in 2011 for the ValleyStar Credit Union 300 in a joint partnership with On Point Motorsports and DGR-Crosley, he would finish 15th.

Other ventures
Poole has been seen as a jack of all trades due to his wherewithal to take roles of any form in the Motorsports space most prominently in his days with Venturini Motorsports in the ARCA Racing Series from 2013 to 2014 when he was left without a full-time ride after the 2012 season due to a lack of funding.

Consulting, Coaching, and Spotting
In his days with Venturini Motorsports from 2013 to 2014 he served as the teams consultant, driver coach, and spotter scoring a few wins along the way with each of his roles, most notably spotting for Erik Jones' first and only ARCA Racing Series win at Berlin Raceway in 2013.

Dartfish
From 2011 to 2014 Poole served as a Dartfish camera operator for Richard Childress Racing’s NASCAR Camping World Truck Series, NASCAR Nationwide Series, and NASCAR Sprint Cup Series teams.

Vlogging
Poole ran a weekly vlog during the 2016 and 2017 seasons which he started back up during the pandemic in the 2020 season.

Charity Work
Poole has been involved in hurricane relief efforts in the past starting in 2017 with Hurricane Harvey for his hometown of The Woodlands, Texas with his Poole For Texas initiative and also in 2018 for Hurricane Florence for Charlotte, North Carolina.

In 2020, Poole, in partnership with Premium Motorsports and Children's Hospital of Orange County, started Brennan’s Miracle Miles to help better CHOC's mental health services and expand their intensive care unit and programs that supported children with Autism Spectrum Disorder.

Personal life
Raised outside of Houston, Texas, Poole was born in Folsom, California, living there until the age of seven.  Poole earned the nickname "The Bull" early in his career, after charging from the rear of the field in several events.

Poole graduated from Woodlands Christian Academy a year early in 2008, at the age of 17.

Motorsports career results

NASCAR
(key) (Bold – Pole position awarded by qualifying time. Italics – Pole position earned by points standings or practice time. * – Most laps led.)

Cup Series

Daytona 500

Xfinity Series

Craftsman Truck Series

 Season still in progress
 Ineligible for series points

ARCA Racing Series
(key) (Bold – Pole position awarded by qualifying time. Italics – Pole position earned by points standings or practice time. * – Most laps led.)

References

External links

 
 

People from The Woodlands, Texas
Sportspeople from Harris County, Texas
ARCA Menards Series drivers
NASCAR drivers
1991 births
Living people
Racing drivers from Houston
Racing drivers from Texas
People from Folsom, California
Chip Ganassi Racing drivers